Benjamin John Hankinson (born May 1, 1969) is an American former professional ice hockey right winger.

Playing career

Hankinson played 43 games in the National Hockey League for the New Jersey Devils and Tampa Bay Lightning between 1993 and 1995. He was a First Team All-Star in the Western Collegiate Hockey Association for the University of Minnesota in 1990. He retired from professional hockey in 1998.

Personal life

Ben is currently a certified NHLPA player agent, and is the USA Director of Player Representation for Octagon Hockey. Some of his clients include Dustin Byfuglien, Paul Martin, Jordan Leopold, Mike Lundin, Raitis Ivanans, Tim Jackman, Ryan McDonagh, John Scott, Brock Boeser and Bobby Brink.

Career statistics

Regular season and playoffs

References

External links
 
 Ben Hankinson's profile at NHLPA.com

1969 births
Living people
Adirondack Red Wings players
Albany River Rats players
American men's ice hockey right wingers
Grand Rapids Griffins players
Ice hockey players from Minnesota
Sportspeople from Edina, Minnesota
Minnesota Golden Gophers men's ice hockey players
New Jersey Devils draft picks
New Jersey Devils players
Orlando Solar Bears (IHL) players
Tampa Bay Lightning players
Utica Devils players